The following lists events that happened during 1887 in New Zealand.

Incumbents

Regal and viceregal
Head of State – Queen Victoria
Governor – Lieutenant-General Sir William Jervois.

Government and law
In the general election on 22 July the Premier Robert Stout loses his seat. A new ministry is formed, the 10th New Zealand Parliament, on 8 October, with Harry Atkinson as Premier, and is announced on 11 October. This is the Atkinson's 4th separate term as Premier.

Speaker of the House – Maurice O'Rorke.
Premier – Harry Atkinson replaces Robert Stout
Minister of Finance – Harry Atkinson replaces Julius Vogel
Chief Justice – Hon Sir James Prendergast

Main centre leaders
Mayor of Auckland – Albert Devore
Mayor of Christchurch – Aaron Ayers
Mayor of Dunedin – Richard Henry Leary followed by William Dawson
Mayor of Wellington – Samuel Brown

Events

Sport

Athletics
The Canterbury, Hawke's Bay, Otago and Southland clubs form the New Zealand Amateur Athletics Association, now Athletics New Zealand. Auckland refuses to join. The NZAAA is "one of the two oldest national bodies among the members of the IAAF". The first New Zealand Championships will be held towards the end of the 1887–88 season (see 1888).

1 October –  A. G. Sheath, with Shot Put,  at Napier, makes the first performance to be recognised as a national record.

Horse racing
The Auckland Cup of 1887 is moved to January 1888. Subsequently the Auckland Cup is normally scheduled for New Year's Day.

Major race winners
New Zealand Cup – Lochiel
New Zealand Derby – Maxim
Auckland Cup – Moved to 1888
Wellington Cup – Pasha

Lawn bowls
The first singles championship is held.

National Champions
Singles – S. Manning (Christchurch)

Rowing
The New Zealand Amateur Rowing Association is formed on 16 March. 9 clubs are present. The first Championships are held at the end of the 1887–88 season. (see 1888)

Rugby Union
The Southland union is formed.

Provincial club rugby champions include: 
see also :Category:Rugby union in New Zealand

Shooting
Ballinger Belt – Captain White (Gordon Rifles, Auckland)

Tennis
The first New Zealand Championships are held.

New Zealand championships
Men's singles – P. Fenwicke
Women's singles – M. Lance
Men's doubles – P. Fenwicke and M. Fenwicke
Women's doubles – M. Way and W. Lance
Mixed doubles – ?. Hudson and K. Hitchings

Births
 17 March: Mary Patricia Anderson, politician (MLC).
 31 March: Mary Dreaver, politician (MLC).
 14 May:  Owen Merton, painter.
 1 September : Harold Caro, Mayor of Hamilton.

Deaths
 25 February: James Macandrew, politician (born 1819).
 June 1887 – Te Mamaku, Māori chief (b. 1790)

See also
List of years in New Zealand
Timeline of New Zealand history
History of New Zealand
Military history of New Zealand
Timeline of the New Zealand environment
Timeline of New Zealand's links with Antarctica

References
General
 Romanos, J. (2001) New Zealand Sporting Records and Lists. Auckland: Hodder Moa Beckett. 
Specific

External links